Events in the year 1987 in Portugal.

Incumbents
President: Mário Soares
Prime Minister: Aníbal Cavaco Silva

Events
March – Joint Declaration on the Question of Macau
19 July – Portuguese legislative election, 1987

Arts and entertainment

Sports
20 September – 1987 Portuguese Grand Prix (Formula One race)

Births
18 September – Luísa Sobral, singer

22 December – Éder, footballer

Deaths
18 September – Américo Tomás, admiral and politician (born 1894).

References

 
1980s in Portugal
Portugal
Years of the 20th century in Portugal
Portugal